The Nadeem Commando is a small militant Muhajir organization in Pakistan. The origin of the group is unknown, but it is thought to have been active from at least the early 1990s until 1996, when the Pakistani government declared that the majority of the group had been arrested or killed in 'Operation Clean Up'. Farooq Dada was presumed its leader until 1995, when he was shot to death by police near Jinnah International Airport. His assumed replacement was also shot and killed by police in 1995. It is believed to have been involved with the Muttahida Qaumi Movement. The Institute for Conflict Management considers them a terrorist group.

References

Rebel groups in Pakistan
Terrorism in Pakistan
Muhajir history
Muttahida Qaumi Movement
Muhajir nationalism